The Last Act of Defiance is the eleventh full-length album by American hardcore punk band Sick of It All. It was released on September 30, 2014, on Century Media Records.

Reception

The Last Act of Defiance received positive reviews from critics. On Metacritic, the album holds a score of 74/100 based on 5 reviews, indicating "generally favorable reviews."

Track list

References

2014 albums
Sick of It All albums
Century Media Records albums
Albums produced by Tue Madsen